Friedrich Lange may refer to:

 Friedrich Lange (artist) (1834–1875), German history painter
 Friedrich Lange (journalist) (1852-1917), German journalist and activist
 Friedrich Lange (surgeon) (1849–1927), German surgeon and supporter of charitable institutions
 Friedrich Albert Lange (1828–1875), German philosopher and sociologist